Resident Alien is an American science fiction mystery comedy-drama television series created by Chris Sheridan, based on the comic book of the same title by Peter Hogan and Steve Parkhouse, that premiered its 10-episode first season on January 27, 2021, on Syfy. The series stars Alan Tudyk in the title role. In March 2021, the series was renewed for a second season which premiered on January 26, 2022. The second season consists of 16 episodes, split into two eight-episode parts, and the second half premiered on August 10, 2022. In July 2022, the series was renewed for a third season, which will consist of 8 episodes.

Premise
After crash-landing on Earth, an alien sent to wipe out humanity kills and takes on the identity of a vacationing pathology physician. He is asked to do an autopsy on the town's doctor, who has died in unknown circumstances. He wrestles with the moral dilemma of his secret mission, while also dealing with the mayor's young son, who can see his true appearance.

Cast and characters

Main 
 Alan Tudyk as "Harry Vanderspeigle", the titular alien with an unpronounceable birth name who has crash-landed on Earth, killed the real Dr. Harry Vanderspeigle, and assumed his identity. He has been sent to Earth to destroy the human race, believing that this would benefit the planet, but he begins to question the moral ambiguity of his mission after involuntarily forming human emotions. He is fascinated by humans and has learned how to speak English, as well as how to masquerade as a medical examiner from watching reruns of Law & Order. Although he attempts to blend in with people, he consistently stands out because of his misunderstanding of social cues and awkward speech and behavioral patterns. As the series progresses, he learns more about human emotions, behaviors, and interactions, often closing episodes with a narration about what he has learned. He possesses superhuman strength, durability, and agility as well as advanced intelligence, shapeshifting abilities, and the power to alter or remove human memories. In the second season finale, Harry is implied to be millions of years old, as he recalls seeing live dinosaurs.
 Tudyk also portrays the real Dr. Harry Vanderspeigle, a corrupt doctor and assassin involved with a crime syndicate who killed the previous town doctor, Sam Hodges.
 Stuntman Keith Arbuthnot plays the alien in his true form: an androgynous, humanoid Octopodiformes being.
 David Bianchi portrays Goliath (recurring season 2), Harry's future self, who traveled back in time in an attempt to correct his mistakes. Goliath’s artwork was created by Joe Vaux, storyboard artist and animation director for the TV show Family Guy.
 Sara Tomko as Asta Twelvetrees, the assistant to the town doctor at the Patience health clinic and a member of the Ute Native American tribe. In high school, she had an abusive relationship with fellow classmate Jimmy and gave up their daughter Jay for adoption. She is the first person to discover Harry's true identity.
 Zara Bacic portrays young Asta in flashbacks.
 Corey Reynolds as Sheriff Mike Thompson, the town's sheriff, who refers to himself as the nickname "Big Black". He masks his insecurities by trying to control every situation. His career as a police officer in Washington, D.C., ended as a result of the death of his partner, leading him to eventually move to Patience. He also looks after the town's police dog, Cletus.
 Alice Wetterlund as D'Arcy Bloom, the owner and bartender of the town bar, The 59, and a local mountaineering expert and Asta's best friend. After a skiing accident at the Olympics, she returned to her hometown, and now spends her days tending bar and making questionable life choices. She discovers Harry's true identity after learning that the real Harry killed Sam Hodges.
 Elle Rivas portrays young D'Arcy in flashbacks.
 Levi Fiehler as Ben Hawthorne, the town's young mayor. He is charming, and his wife, Kate, is dominant in their relationship. He previously dated D'Arcy in junior high and high school, although they still seem interested in each other. He is a hobbyist candlemaker, but his work goes unappreciated.
 Lukas Goas portrays young Ben in flashbacks.
 Judah Prehn as Max Hawthorne, Ben and Kate's son and the only resident of Patience who can see Harry's true form as well as the "green glow" emitted by alien technology. Harry at first repeatedly threatens to kill Max and tries to get him to move away, but soon warms to the boy.
 Elizabeth Bowen as Deputy Olivia "Liv" Baker (season 2, recurring season 1), the town's only deputy, who works with Sheriff Mike. She is underappreciated and ignored by the sheriff, although he gradually learns to appreciate her over time. After she briefly quits the force, Sheriff Mike, with some help, comes to recognize her skills and the two begin to work together more in harmony. She has been fascinated by the possibility of extraterrestrials existing ever since she witnessed what appeared to be a UFO.
 Jessica Halliburton portrays young Liv in flashbacks.

Recurring 
 Meredith Garretson as Kate Hawthorne, Ben's wife and Max's mother, who works as a schoolteacher.
 Gracelyn Awad Rinke as Sahar, Max's adventurous friend and classmate and a devout Muslim. Sahar joins Max in his efforts to help Harry after he convinces her that Harry is an alien, and she often acts as the more mature and responsible of the two.
 Gary Farmer as Dan Twelvetrees, Asta's adoptive father and a Vietnam veteran, who owns the town's diner, Joe's Diner, which he has named in honor of a friend and fellow soldier he lost in the war. Asta informs him of Harry's true identity so he can save the alien's life.
 Diana Bang as Nurse Ellen Cho, a nurse at the Patience health clinic who is disrespectful to almost everyone she encounters, none more so than Asta, whose name she knowingly mispronounces.
 Ben Cotton as Jimmy (season 1; guest season 2), Asta's abusive ex-husband and Jay's father.
 Kaylayla Raine as Jay, Asta's estranged, surly daughter who works part-time at the Patience health clinic.
 Deborah Finkel as Abigail Hodges, the wife of Dr. Sam Hodges, the previous town doctor.
 Mandell Maughan as Agent Lisa Casper (seasons 1–2), a sociopathic government agent who works for General McCallister. She has no problem killing anyone she encounters and looks forward to her next kill. Like McCallister, she secretly works for an unknown organization dedicated to hunting extraterrestrials. She meets her end during a fight with Harry on a train from New York City, where he dangles her out of a train window and an oncoming train from the opposite track decapitates her.
 Alex Barima as Lieutenant David Logan, a lieutenant in the U.S. military who works for General McCallister. After piecing together clues about Harry's crash landing, General McCallister recruits him to find the alien before her superiors do. He is unfortunately partnered with Lisa Casper and is tormented by her. Although he is eventually separated from her, he continues searching for Harry.
 Jenna Lamia as Judy Cooper, who works at the local bowling alley. She is sexually adventurous and often trades barbs with D'Arcy.
 Lilly Dean portrays young Judy in flashbacks.
 Sarah Podemski as Kayla, Asta's cousin and close friend who is a mother and a lawyer.
 Acahkos Johnson portrays young Kayla in flashbacks.
 Elvy Yost as Isabelle (season 1), the real Harry's estranged wife and a British artist who won her husband over at a New York City art exhibition.
 Linda Hamilton as General Eleanor McCallister, a high-ranking U.S. military officer who secretly works for an unknown organization dedicated to hunting extraterrestrials. McCallister saw a spacecraft firsthand, and she has spent her life seeking more proof that aliens exist.
 Alix West Lefler portrays young Eleanor Wright in flashbacks.
 Michael Cassidy as Dr. Ethan Stone (season 1; guest season 2), who replaces Harry as the new town doctor. He is abducted by General McCallister's agents after Max tells them that the alien is the "town doctor" but released after McCallister confirms he is human.
 Nathan Fillion as the voice of 42 (season 2; guest season 1), an octopus who can communicate telepathically with Harry. Their conversation suggests that Harry's species and octopuses are closely related, something Harry himself later states to Asta, and is further reinforced when Harry describes his own alien species as a kind of Octopodiformes. 42 is initially stranded in a restaurant tank until Harry gives him a new residence in a tank inside his cabin. He dies when Harry leaves a dog he has kidnapped in the same room as the tank and the dog mortally wounds him, leaving Harry to fulfill 42's last request: to be cooked and eaten.
 Alvin Sanders as Lewis Thompson (season 2; guest season 1), Mike's elderly father who moved with him to Patience due to his worsening condition.
 Trevor Carroll as John Baker (season 2; guest season 1), Liv's husband and an avalanche-control team member.
 Terry O'Quinn as Peter Bach (season 2; guest season 1), an "alien experiencer" who hosts the popular podcast Alien Tracker. He and his wife came into contact with extraterrestrials 30 years ago, when their unborn son was abducted. Like Max, he can also see Harry's true form. He eventually teams up with Harry to locate his son, but after reuniting with him, Peter is killed by Joseph: a Grey alien-human hybrid assassin.
 Justin Rain as Elliot (season 2), a Native American archaeologist who starts an on-and-off relationship with D'Arcy.
 Paul Piaskowski as Robert Hutchins (season 2), Peter Bach's son, who was abducted by the Greys from his pregnant mother's womb. After being raised by the aliens. He is captured by General McCallister but rescued by his father and Harry.
 Enver Gjokaj as "Joseph Rainier" (season 2), a Grey alien-human hybrid working for General McCallister.
 Nicola Correia-Damude as Detective Lena Torres (season 2), a detective based in Jessup, the neighboring town to Patience, who works with Mike and Liv when a murder is committed on the town border. She soon bonds with Mike over their respective pasts working in major cities and becomes romantically interested in him.
 Kesler Talbot as the "Humalien"/"Bridget" (season 2), the human-alien offspring of "Goliath", Harry's future self. It disguises itself as Bobby Smallwood, a boy who went missing decades prior. After saving it from General McCallister's military base, Harry sends it to his home planet for safety. 
Talbot also portrays the real Bobby Smallwood in flashbacks.

Guest stars 
 Giorgio A. Tsoukalos as himself (seasons 1–2), a ufologist who hosts a panel on Ancient Aliens at a UFO convention.
 Alex Borstein as Carlyn (season 2), a laser physicist and cousin of Kate Hawthorne, who gets romantically involved with Harry.
 Maxim Roy as Violinda Darvell (season 2), the owner and operator of a prestigious art gallery in New York who was romantically involved with the artist named "Goliath", who is Harry's future self, having traveled back in time to save humanity from destruction. She is also the human mother of the "Humalien".
 George Takei as the voice of a Grey alien (season 2), who speaks to Harry about the Greys' planned invasion.

Episodes

Series overview

Season 1 (2021)

Season 2 (2022)

Production

Development
Series creator Chris Sheridan stated that he was inspired to start the Resident Alien television project after reading the novels and comic book series of the same name. Upon being interviewed at a Television Critics Association panel in January 2020, he also stated that his real inspiration came from an aerial phenomenon "close encounter" he and his wife witnessed while honeymooning in the Bahamas twenty years ago.

On May 31, 2018, Syfy announced that the TV adaptation of Resident Alien was given a pilot order with Chris Sheridan as the show creator and Universal Cable Productions, Dark Horse Entertainment, and Amblin Television developing the pilot. On February 28, 2019, Syfy gave a series order with production starting in Vancouver, and David Dobkin directing and serving as an executive producer for the pilot. Robert Duncan McNeill executive produced and was producing director for the remaining episodes. On March 17, 2021, Syfy renewed the series for a second season, which premiered on January 26, 2022.

On July 21, 2022, Syfy renewed the series for a 12-episode third season. On November 15, 2022, Syfy cut down from 12 episodes to 8 episodes for the third season.

Casting
On September 20, 2018, Alan Tudyk was cast as the main character "Dr. Harry Vanderspeigle" in the pilot, along with Sara Tomko, Corey Reynolds, Alice Wetterlund, and Levi Fiehler. On January 31, 2020, Linda Hamilton, Mandell Maughan, and Alex Barima were cast in the recurring roles in the series. On February 12, 2020, Elizabeth Bowen was cast in the recurring role of Deputy Sheriff Liv Baker in the series.

Filming
Principal photography for the first season began on September 10, 2020, and concluded on October 14, 2020, in Delta, British Columbia, Canada. Filming for the second season began on August 3, 2021, and concluded on April 1, 2022. Filming for the first half of the second season took place in Ladysmith, British Columbia, with filming for the second half taking place from February 27, 2022. Filming for the third season began on January 30, 2023, and will conclude on May 2, 2023.

Release
On February 13, 2020, Syfy announced that the series would premiere in summer 2020. However, on October 9, 2020, the premiere was moved to January 2021, specifically January 27 in the United States. Internationally, the series premiered in Canada on CTV Sci-Fi Channel on January 27, 2021, and in the United Kingdom on Sky One the following day.

Reception

Critical response
For the first season, review aggregator Rotten Tomatoes reported a "certified fresh" approval rating of 94% based on 31 critic reviews, with an average rating of 7.8/10. The website's critics consensus reads, "Resident Alien takes a minute to settle into its skin, but once it does it finds fresh humor in a familiar framework and proves a perfect showcase for Alan Tudyk's singular comedic skills". Metacritic gave the first season a weighted average score of 70 out of 100 based on 15 critic reviews, indicating "generally favorable reviews".

Ratings

Season 1

Season 2

Accolades

Notes

References

External links
 
 

2020s American comedy-drama television series
2020s American comic science fiction television series
2020s American mystery television series
2021 American television series debuts
English-language television shows
Fictional octopuses
Syfy original programming
Television series about alien visitations
Television series by Amblin Entertainment
Television series by Universal Content Productions
Television shows based on Dark Horse Comics
Television shows filmed in Vancouver
Television shows set in Colorado